Alpha Dog  is a 2006 American crime drama film written and directed by Nick Cassavetes. It is based on the true story of the kidnapping and murder of Nicholas Markowitz in 2000. The film features an ensemble cast that includes Ben Foster, Shawn Hatosy, Emile Hirsch, Christopher Marquette, Sharon Stone, Justin Timberlake, Anton Yelchin, and Bruce Willis. 

Alpha Dog had its world premiere at the 2006 Sundance Film Festival on January 27, 2006, and was released in the United States on January 12, 2007, by Universal Pictures.

Plot
In 1999, Johnny Truelove works as a young drug dealer while making a living in the San Gabriel Valley. 

Johnny's father, Sonny, supplies him with marijuana, which he distributes with his gang of friends: Frankie Ballenbacher, Johnny's right-hand man; Tiko Martinez, the group’s muscle; Elvis Schmidt, who is ridiculed for being in debt to Johnny; and Jake Mazursky, a drug addict also in debt with Johnny. Jake attempts to borrow money from his father and stepmother, while his younger half-brother Zack looks up to him and longs to escape his home life.

A fight breaks out when Jake tries to pay Johnny only part of his debt, leading Johnny to get him fired, and Jake to retaliate by breaking into Johnny’s apartment. Johnny brings Frankie and Tiko to confront Jake, but he is nowhere to be found. Spotting Zack on the side of a road, Johnny impulsively orders the gang to kidnap him, planning to hold Zack until Jake pays his debt. Wanting a break from home, Zack makes no effort to escape, and they drive to Palm Springs. Frankie is left to watch Zack, offering him a chance to leave, but Zack declines, not wanting to cause problems for his brother.

Staying at the house of Frankie's father, Zack bonds with him and ingratiates himself with his friends Keith, Julie, Sabrina, and Susan, though only Susan is concerned by his abduction. Frankie suggests to Johnny that they pay Zack to keep quiet about the kidnapping, and Johnny agrees. However, after a threatening phone call with Jake, and learning from his lawyer that he could face life in prison, Johnny offers to forget Elvis' debt if he kills Zack, giving him a submachine gun. Believing Zack will be returning home that night, Frankie and his friends throw a raucous party at a hotel. Zack goes swimming naked with Julie and her friend Alma, leading to a threesome.

Everyone happily says goodbye to Zack, until Elvis arrives, arguing with Frankie over Johnny’s plan to kill Zack. While Frankie runs off, Elvis introduces himself to Zack, then takes Keith to dig a grave in the nearby mountains. Frankie returns and gives Zack a final opportunity to escape, but Zack declines, oblivious to the danger he is in. Elvis and Keith return, and Frankie relents when Elvis explains they could face life in prison. Sonny, Johnny's godfather Cosmo, and their lawyer confront Johnny, who refuses to call off the hit on Zack. Zack is later brought to the grave, and despite his and Frankie’s pleas, Elvis insists on following through. Frankie calms Zack and ties him up with duct tape, before Elvis knocks Zack into the grave and shoots him dead. 

Zack's body is soon discovered a few days later. Intercuts throughout the film include interviews conducted by Tom Finnegan, a detective, with people connected to Johnny’s gang, and some of the 38 witnesses who saw Zack between his initial kidnapping and eventual murder. One of the witnesses is Zack’s mother Olivia, now suffering from obesity and depression, who talks candidly about attempting suicide in the weeks after her son's tragic death. 

Sometime later, Susan angrily confronts Frankie over the murder of Zack before she goes to alert the authorities. Elvis is caught trying to secure a lift out of town. Johnny flees to Albuquerque, New Mexico where an old classmate then drives him to Cosmo's house. Tiko is convicted of kidnapping and sentenced to nine years in prison; Keith is convicted of second degree murder and remains at the California Youth Authority until the age of 25; Frankie is convicted of aggravated kidnapping of special circumstances and receives a life sentence; Elvis is convicted of kidnapping and first degree murder, and is currently on Death Row in San Quentin State Prison. 

Upon being asked about how his son was able to escape authorities for four years without help, Sonny denies any claim. In 2005, after over five years on the FBI’s most wanted list, Johnny is arrested in Paraguay, now in California awaiting trial, facing the death penalty.

Cast
 Emile Hirsch as Johnny Truelove, the leader, or the "alpha dog." Inspired by Jesse James Hollywood. Hollywood was convicted on July 8, 2009, for ordering the kidnapping and murder of Nick Markowitz and sentenced to life in prison without the possibility of parole. He was 20 years old at the time of the murder.
 Justin Timberlake as Frankie "Nuts" Ballenbacher, Johnny's right hand man and best friend, who becomes friends with Zack when he is assigned to watch him. Inspired by Jesse Rugge. Rugge was acquitted of 1st degree murder, but was charged with aggravated kidnapping with special circumstances. He was sentenced to life in prison, with the possibility of parole after seven years. His petition for parole was denied in 2006. On July 2, 2013, Rugge was granted parole, and on October 24, 2013, he was released from prison after serving 11 years of his life sentence. He was 20 years old at the time of the crime.
 Ben Foster as Jake Mazursky, Zack's older brother. Inspired by Benjamin Markowitz. Markowitz was 22 years old at the time of the crimes against his half-brother and served three years in prison for robbery but has since been released.
 Shawn Hatosy as Elvis Schmidt, the lowest member of the gang and the shooter. At the beginning of the story, he is in debt to Johnny. Inspired by Ryan Hoyt. Hoyt is currently on death row at San Quentin for the murder of Nick Markowitz. He was 21 years old at the time of the crime.
 Anton Yelchin as Zack Mazursky, the victim. Inspired by Nicholas Markowitz. Markowitz was murdered by Ryan Hoyt, a member of Jesse James Hollywood's crew; he was 15 years old when he died. Hollywood has since been tried and convicted for the kidnapping and his role in the murder.
 Sharon Stone as Olivia Mazursky, Zack's mother. Inspired by Susan Markowitz. Susan is Nick Markowitz's mother; she later authored a book called My Stolen Son: The Nick Markowitz Story
 Bruce Willis as Sonny Truelove, Johnny's father and marijuana supplier. It is implied that he has Mafia connections. Inspired by John "Jack" Hollywood. Hollywood is Jesse James's father. He was arrested in 2005, the same day son Jesse James was captured in Brazil, for manufacturing GHB, but the charge was later dismissed. Jack remained in custody on an outstanding 2002 warrant for a marijuana-related charge and later received 18 months in an Arizona prison. He has since been released.
 Chris Marquette as Keith Stratten, a friend of Frankie who digs Zack's grave but is not present for the murder. Inspired by Graham Pressley. In July 2002, he was tried as a minor and in October 2002 as an adult. Served eight years at the California Youth Authority until he was released in 2007 at the age of 25. Age 17 at the time.
 Dominique Swain as Susan Hartunian, a friend of Frankie's who is concerned about Zack's well-being. Inspired by Natasha Adams-Young. Adams-Young was given immunity in exchange for her testimony. Friend of Rugge and Pressley. After reading in the paper that Nick was murdered, she confronted Rugge and asked if he had anything to do with it. Despite Rugge explaining that he didn't, she knew he was lying and told her father, a lawyer, what happened. In turn, called the police. Age 19 at the time.
 Alex Solowitz as Bobby "911" Kaye, a member of the gang. Inspired by Brian Affronti. Affronti joined Hollywood and the crew minutes after they had kidnapped Nick. 20 years old at the time.
 Fernando Vargas as Tiko "TKO" Martinez, a member of the gang and muscle of the group. Inspired by William Skidmore. Skidmore served nine years in state prison for kidnapping and robbery out of a plea bargain and was released in April 2009. 20 years old at the time.
 Olivia Wilde as Angela Holden, Johnny's girlfriend. Inspired by Michelle Lasher. Hollywood's girlfriend. She was arrested while on the run with him and charged with harboring a fugitive. 19 years old at the time.
 Amanda Seyfried as Julie Beckley, Zack's girlfriend. Inspired by Jeanine, Nick's girlfriend. 17 years old at the time.
 Vincent Kartheiser as Pick Giaimo, a member of the gang whose car was used in the murder. Inspired by Casey Sheehan. Sheehan was one of Hollywood's friends. His vehicle was used in the murder of Nick Markowitz. Arrested, then bailed out; 20 years old at the time.
 Lukas Haas as Buzz Fecske, Johnny's childhood friend who drives him back to Los Angeles after he escapes the police in New Mexico.
 Heather Wahlquist as Wanda Haynes, Jake's girlfriend, a waitress at a steakhouse. 
 Harry Dean Stanton as Cosmo Gadabeeti, Johnny's godfather. Implied he has connections to the Mafia. Inspired by Jon Roberts. Roberts was a Hollywood family close friend. His van was used in the kidnapping of Nick Markowitz.
 David Thornton as Butch Mazursky, Zack and Jake's father. Inspired by Jeff Markowitz. Markowitz was Nick and Ben Markowitz's father.
 Charity Shea as Sabrina Pope, Frankie's girlfriend. Inspired by Kelly Carpenter, Rugge's girlfriend. Carpenter was given immunity in exchange for testimony; 16 at the time.
 Holt McCallany as Detective Tom Finnegan, police officer. Finnegan was the officer looking for Hollywood; he arrested the crew as well as interviewed witnesses.
 Amber Heard as Alma, a friend of Julie who hooked up with Zack.
 Alex Kingston as Tiffany Hartunian, Susan's mother.

Legal issues
During filming, Santa Barbara County Deputy District Attorney Ronald J. Zonen provided copies of many documents on the case and served as an unpaid consultant to the film, citing his desire to have Hollywood captured. Zonen prosecuted Hollywood's co-defendants and was poised to prosecute Hollywood. After Hollywood was captured in Saquarema, Brazil, and subsequently returned to the United States, his defense lawyer claimed Zonen had a conflict of interest; the California Court of Appeal for the Second District ruled on October 5, 2006, that Zonen should be recused from further involvement in prosecuting Hollywood because of his disclosure of the files and work on the film. The California Supreme Court subsequently reversed that holding, but Zonen was replaced as lead prosecution attorney by Deputy District Attorney Joshua Lynn.

Hollywood's attorney, James Blatt, tried to block the release of the film. After the delay, Hollywood's trial started May 15, 2009, with the defense's opening statements saying Hollywood was not involved with the murder. In his opening statement, Lynn described Hollywood as "a ruthless coward." On July 8, 2009, Hollywood was convicted of simple kidnapping and first-degree murder with special circumstances and was sentenced to life in prison without the possibility of parole.

Release

Alpha Dog was first screened at the Sundance Film Festival on January 27, 2006 as the closing film. The film was originally to be distributed by New Line Cinema, however, the company sold the film to Universal Pictures after they requested edits to the film that director Nick Cassavetes didn't want to make. The film's release was delayed by a year to January 12, 2007.

Home media
Alpha Dog was released on DVD and HD-DVD on May 1, 2007. DVD sales gathered $12,324,535 in revenue from 743,036 units sold. It was released on Blu-ray on July 13, 2010.

Reception

Box office
During its opening weekend, Alpha Dog grossed $6,412,775 and was #7 at the box office. The film closed on February 22, 2007 after grossing $15,309,602 domestically, and totaled $32,145,115 worldwide over its six-week release.

In the United States, Alpha Dog was released on January 12, 2007 along with Stomp the Yard & Primeval.

Critical reception
On Rotten Tomatoes, Alpha Dog received a positive review from 54% of 144 surveyed critics. The consensus states, "A glossy yet unflinching portrait of violent, hedonistic teenagers. Bruce Willis and Sharon Stone chew the scenery, while Justin Timberlake gives a noteworthy performance." On Metacritic the film has a score of 53% based on reviews from 30 critics. Audiences polled by CinemaScore gave the film an average grade of "B−" on an A+ to F scale.

Justin Chang of Variety wrote: "Writer-director Nick Cassavetes' sprawling dramatization recklessly blurs the line between reconstruction and reality in ways that are admittedly interesting, if more than a little artistically suspect."
Yelchin was praised as "able to bring all of the conflicting emotions of Zack," and conveying all of it beautifully.

Markowitz family reaction
Susan Markowitz attempted suicide three times. Jeff Markowitz elaborated, "She is so tortured by what happened that she has tried to take her own life. The last thing that either of us want is to see this picture. How would any loving parent feel about a Hollywood movie that glamorizes their son's death and allows celebrities to cash in on a brutal, evil murder?" Nonetheless, both Susan and Jeff attended the film's premiere, and Susan stated she was moved by Anton Yelchin's portrayal of Zack (Nick). After the screening, she embraced Sharon Stone, who played Olivia (Susan).

Accolades

Soundtrack

A soundtrack was released by Milan Records on January 9, 2007.

 "Over the Rainbow" (Eva Cassidy)
 "Enemy and I" (Lazarus)
 "Bullet & a Target" (Citizen Cope)
 "Jake Breaks In" (Paul Bushnell)
 "Caribou Lou" (Tech N9ne)
 "Revolving" (Paul Bushnell)
 "Slither" (Tech N9ne)
 "Liar" (Miredys Peguero & Paul Graham)
 "Winner" (Paul Bushnell)
 "Let's Chill" (Mic Holden, Maya & Reneé Rogers)
 "Dragonfly" (Miredys Peguero & Paul Bushnell)
 "LA LA Land" (Tech N9ne feat. Gina Cassavetes)
 "Pool Party" (Mic Holden)
 "Never Give Up" (Mic Holden)
 "At the Site/Driving to the Site"
 "We Are The Lost" (Lawrence Faljean)
 "Basketball" (Lowd)
 "Cookie Monster" (Paul Graham & Paul Bushnell)
 "Elvis Arrested"
 "Weightlifting" (Lowd)
 "Marco Polo" (Lowd & Cassie Simone)
 "Night and Day" (Tech N9ne)
 "Say Goodbye Hollywood" (Eminem)

References

External links

 
 
 

2006 biographical drama films
2006 crime drama films
2006 films
2006 independent films
American biographical drama films
American crime drama films
American independent films
American nonlinear narrative films
Crime films based on actual events
2000s English-language films
Films about drugs
Films about kidnapping
Films about murder
Films directed by Nick Cassavetes
Films produced by Sidney Kimmel
Films scored by Aaron Zigman
Films set in 1999
Films set in 2000
Films set in Los Angeles
Films shot in the Las Vegas Valley
Films shot in Los Angeles
Sidney Kimmel Entertainment films
Universal Pictures films
2000s American films